This is a list of Scottish Professional Football League (SPFL) managers, in order of the date of their appointment. The SPFL has 42 member clubs and is split into four divisions; the Premiership (12 clubs), the Championship (10), League One (10), and League Two (10).

List of managers

Notes

References

Scotland
 
 
Managers